Harbor Tunnel has the following meanings:
Baltimore Harbor Tunnel and the Harbor Tunnel Thruway that feeds it
Cross-Harbor Rail Tunnel in New York Harbor
Ted Williams Tunnel (also known as Third Harbor Tunnel) in Boston Harbor